Ableton AG is a German music software company that produces and distributes the production and performance program Ableton Live and a collection of related instruments and sample libraries, as well as their own hardware controller Ableton Push. Ableton's office is located in the Prenzlauer Berg district of Berlin, Germany, with a second office in Pasadena, California.

History 
Ableton was founded in 1999 by Gerhard Behles and Robert Henke, who together formed the group Monolake, and software engineer Bernd Roggendorf. After Behles' work on granular synthesis for Native Instruments' Reaktor, as well as earlier software using a Silicon Graphics workstation at the Technical University of Berlin, Live was first released as commercial software in 2001. Behles remains the chief executive officer of Ableton.

In March 2007, Ableton announced it was beginning a collaboration with Cycling '74, producers of Max/MSP. This collaboration is not directly based on Live or Max/MSP, but rather combines the two companies' strengths in a new product.

In January 2009, the Ableton/Cycling '74 product "Max for Live" was announced. "Max for Live" makes it possible to create Max/MSP patches directly inside of Live. The patches act like other plug-ins in Live do, supporting preset saving, automation, and other features. It is possible to create both customized hardware plug-ins and patches as well as actions within those plug-ins that control every aspect of Live, essentially anything that can be clicked with a mouse.

Ableton holds many music production sessions and seminars to learn to use their software, and licenses "certified Ableton trainers."

In April 2015, Ableton published the hardcover book Making Music: 74 Creative Strategies for Electronic Music Producers written by Dennis DeSantis who is the Head of Documentation at Ableton and formerly a sound designer for Native Instruments. The work is organized according to three main categories: Problems of Beginning, Problems of Progressing, and Problems of Finishing and aims primarily to address "the non-technical aspects of the process of making music." While it shows images only of Ableton Live, the information is not specific to Ableton Live.

In June 2017, Ableton acquired Cycling '74, developers of the digital signal processing environment Max/MSP and its integrated version Max for Live.

In the first quarter of 2018, Ableton Live 10 was officially released, and the release of the new version added some new features to Ableton Push 2, including a new melodic step sequencing layout and MIDI note view.

In late 2020, Ableton officially announced Ableton Live 11 for 2021 Q1 and was released on 23 February 2021.

Products

Ableton Live

Ableton Live is a digital audio workstation developed by Ableton and is currently in its eleventh version. There are four versions of the software, of which three are available for purchase: Live 11 Standard (the core software for music performance and creation), Live 11 Suite (Ableton Live, Max for Live + all of Ableton's software instruments/effects), Live 11 Intro (an introductory version of Live with track and effect limitations), and Live Lite (currently at version 11) that comes bundled free with a number of hardware and applications but is not available to buy separately. Ableton Live is designed to be used with a wide range of USB and MIDI controllers, as well as instruments and virtual instruments.

Ableton Push

In March 2013, the company released the Push controller for Live 9 in cooperation with Akai Professional. It gives access to most performing elements within the digital audio workstation from the one unit, playing notes on a device or instrument, sequencing melodic notes and parameters, and triggering clips via a 64 pad matrix. In November 2015, Ableton released the second iteration of the Push, Ableton Push 2, which features an onboard display and better integration with the Live software.

Ableton Operator 
Operator is a software synthesizer developed by Ableton, first released in 2005. It runs exclusively in Ableton Live, and is included with the Suite version of the program; Live Lite users can purchase Operator separately for 99 USD. It uses a hybrid of frequency modulation (FM), subtractive, and additive synthesis with four oscillators, and has been used by artists including Skrillex and Monolake.

Ableton Note 
Note is a mobile companion app to Ableton Live.

See also 
Digital audio workstation
:Category:Ableton Live users

References

Articles
 The MusicRadar Team (Production Expo). "The 19 best DAW software apps in the world today" Archived (September 2014).
 Golden, Ean. "Ableton Push: New Hardware Controller for Live"  (October 2012)

External links 
 Ableton Homepage

Companies based in Berlin
German brands
Software companies of Germany
Music equipment manufacturers